The Queen Alexandra Hospital for Women was a maternity hospital and children hospital established at Hobart, Tasmania in 1905 to commemorate the coronation of King Edward VII and Queen Alexandra in 1902 on a site in Hampden Road, Battery Point.

The hospital was primarily designed to care for women who were pregnant, in need of natal and neonatal care, and as a training hospital for midwives and nurses.

It was originally operated by a private board of management, but in 1950 it came under the control of the Government of Tasmania, who increasingly affiliated its services with those of the Royal Hobart Hospital. In 1980, the building in Battery Point which was becoming too antiquated for modern health care services, was closed, and the Queen Alexandra hospital was moved to a new wing attached to the Royal. In 1999, the Queen Alexandra wing was closed and sold off to a private consortium, who re-opened the site as the Hobart Private Hospital.

Hollywood actor Errol Flynn was born at the hospital in 1909. The perpetrator of the Port Arthur massacre was born at the hospital in May 1967., Mary Donaldson, Crown Princess Mary was born in Queen Alexandria Hospital on February 1972.

References

Hospital buildings completed in 1980
Hospitals in Hobart
Hospitals established in 1902
1902 establishments in Australia
1980 disestablishments in Australia